Carl J. Strikwerda (born 1952) is an American historian. He was the president of Elizabethtown College until 2019.

Biography
Strikwerda is the former dean of the faculty of arts and sciences at the College of William & Mary in Williamsburg, Virginia. He has also previously worked at the University of Kansas.
 
On October 1, 2011, Strikwerda was inaugurated as Elizabethtown College's fourteenth president. 

Strikwerda earned a bachelor's degree in history at Calvin College, in Grand Rapids, Michigan, a master's degree in history from the University of Chicago, and his Ph.D. in European history from the University of Michigan. 

He served as an historical consultant to the National World War One Museum in Kansas City, Missouri. He also served as treasurer and member of the board of directors of the Council of Colleges of Arts and Sciences whose headquarters he brought to the College of William and Mary while he served there as dean. 

Currently, he serves as a member of the board of directors of the Council for European Studies, as a member of the President's Trust of the American Association of Colleges and Universities, and as a member of the board of directors of public radio and TV station WITF. 

His op-eds and essays have appeared in the The Chronicle of Higher Education, Huffington Post, and Inside Higher Ed. 

He is married to Gail M. Bossenga, who graduated from Calvin College, received her Ph.D. in history from the University of Michigan, and writes about eighteenth century France and the origins of the French Revolution. She is currently scholar-in-residence at Elizabethtown College. The couple have two children, Laurna Strikwerda, who lives in Washington, D.C. and works as a specialist on the Mideast, and Tim Strikwerda, who lives in Oregon and is pursuing doctoral studies on Japan. Laurna is married to Ian Ward.

Selected publications 
 McCartan, Anne-Marie and Carl J. Strikwerda, eds. Deans and Development: Making the Case for the Liberal Arts, Williamsburg: Council of Colleges of Arts and Sciences, 2014. 
 Strikwerda, Carl. A House Divided: Catholics, Socialists, and Flemish nationalists in Nineteenth-century Belgium. Lanham: Rowman & Littlefield, 1997.
 Furlough, Ellen, and Carl Strikwerda, eds. Consumers against capitalism?: consumer cooperation in Europe, North America, and Japan, 1840-1990. Lanham: Rowman & Littlefield, 1999.
Guerin-Gonzales, Camille and Carl Strikwerda, eds. The Politics of Immigrant Workers: Labor Activism and Migration in the World Economy Since 1830. New York: Holmes and Meier, 1993; 2nd ed. 1998.

Articles, a selection:
 Strikwerda, Carl. "Too Much of a Good Thing? Consumption, Consumerism, and Consumer Cooperation in Modern History," International Review of Social History, 63 (2018), 127–142. 
Strikwerda, Carl J. "World War I and the History of Globalization," Historical Reflections/Reflexions historiques, 42:3 Winter (2016), 112–132. 
Strikwerda, Carl. "The troubled origins of European economic integration: international iron and steel and labor migration in the era of World War I." The American Historical Review (1993): 1106–1129.
 Strikwerda, Carl. "Reinterpreting the history of European integration: business, labor, and social citizenship in twentieth-century Europe." European Integration in Social and Historical Perspective 1850 to the Present eds. Jytte Klausen and Louise Tilly. Lanham: Rowman and Littlefield, 1998: 51–70.

References

External links
Elizabethtown College – Office of the President

Calvin University alumni
College of William & Mary faculty
Living people
Writers from Grand Rapids, Michigan
Presidents of Elizabethtown College
University of Chicago alumni
University of Kansas faculty
University of Michigan College of Literature, Science, and the Arts alumni
20th-century American historians
American male non-fiction writers
21st-century American historians
21st-century American male writers
1952 births
Historians of Belgium
Historians from Michigan
20th-century American male writers